Le Train des Plantations of the Les Rails de la Canne à Sucre association is a  long, privately owned heritage railway with Usine Sainte-Marie's (USM's) original gauge of  in Sainte-Marie in Martinique.

Location 

The narrow gauge train runs from Rhum Museum at the Saint James Distillery in Sainte-Marie through sugarcane and banana plantations over two Bailey bridges to the Banana Museum.

Operation 
The heritage train is operated by an enthusiastic team of retired employees of RATP, SNCF, the police and the post Tuesday to Saturday from 9:30 to 13:30.

Locomotives 
A Davenport diesel locomotive Moïse with a 232 hp Deutz engine was salvaged from the bed of the Cherry River (Rivière Cerise).

A Corpet-Louvet six-wheeler steam locomotive with works No 1701 of 1925 is exhibited in a well preserved but non-functional condition at Saint James station.

External links 
 www.traindesplantations-rcs.fr (Official Website)
 Victor Monier: You-Tube Video: Le petit train de l'habitation Saint James
 Jacques Mathou: You-Tube Video: Le train des plantations (extraits)

References 

3 ft 10 in gauge railways
Sugar mill railways
Heritage railways
Transport in Martinique